Panikera (sometimes spelled Panikara) is a village in Telangana, India, It is located in the Nekkonda mandal and block of the Warangal district.

Demographics
According to the 2011 census of India, the village has a population of 1136, including 556  males and 580 females.

References 

Villages in Mahabubabad district